The 1999 Cal Poly Mustangs football team represented California Polytechnic State University during the 1999 NCAA Division I-AA football season.

Cal Poly competed as an NCAA Division I-AA independent in 1999. The Mustangs were led by third-year head coach Larry Welsh and played home games at Mustang Stadium in San Luis Obispo, California. The Mustangs finished the season with a record of three wins and eight losses (3–8) for the second consecutive year. Overall, the team was outscored by its opponents 246–345 for the season.

Schedule

Notes

References

Cal Poly
Cal Poly Mustangs football seasons
Cal Poly Mustangs football